Tanju Öztürk (born 22 July 1989) is a German-Turkish professional footballer who plays as a midfielder for Rot-Weiß Oberhausen.

Career
Öztürk played his first Bundesliga match for MSV Duisburg on 18 March 2012 in a 2–1 home win against VfL Bochum.

On 15 January 2015, he joined FC Schalke 04 II.

In January 2019, Öztürk was one of two players to be suspended by KFC Uerdingen 05 for "disciplinary reasons".

Career statistics

Club

References

External links
 
 

Living people
1989 births
Footballers from Cologne
Association football midfielders
German footballers
German people of Turkish descent
MSV Duisburg II players
MSV Duisburg players
KFC Uerdingen 05 players
FC Hansa Rostock players
Rot-Weiß Oberhausen players
2. Bundesliga players
3. Liga players
Regionalliga players